Brett Knowles (born 13 May 1978) is a former Australian rules footballer who played with St Kilda in the Australian Football League (AFL). Recruited from Morwell through Gippsland Power, Knowles spent his debut season playing for St Kilda reserves in 1997. Given an opportunity to play at senior level in 1998, he showed promise but was sidelined in 1999 due to an injury. His most successful year was 2000, when he played 17 games, but lost form early in 2001 and was eventually dropped from the senior team.

Sources
 Holmesby, Russell & Main, Jim (2007). The Encyclopedia of AFL Footballers. 7th ed. Melbourne: Bas Publishing.

External links
 
 

1978 births
Australian rules footballers from Victoria (Australia)
St Kilda Football Club players
Gippsland Power players
Morwell Football Club players
Living people
People from Morwell, Victoria